Luka Mijaljević (born 9 March 1991) is a Swedish footballer who plays as a forward.

Personal life
Born in Sweden, Mijaljević is of Croatian descent.

References

External links

Luka Mijaljević at Lagstatistik

1991 births
Living people
Association football forwards
Swedish footballers
Swedish people of Croatian descent
Superettan players
Croatian Football League players
Örgryte IS players
Utsiktens BK players
NK Istra 1961 players
Landskrona BoIS players
Ljungskile SK players
GAIS players
AFC Eskilstuna players